"Do not forget me" is a Russian song written by Ruslan Gorobets and Pavel Zhagun that was first released on Valery Leontiev's album Everyone wants to love in 1999.

Editions
 Album Everyone wants to love (1999)
 Album Star series (Valery Leontiev) (1999)
 Album Best songs 1 (Valery Leontiev) (1999)
 Album Best songs 2 (Valery Leontiev) (1999)
 Album The BEST of Valery Leontiev (2001)

External links 
 Valery Leontiev first performance of Do not forget me

1999 songs
Russian songs